Parliamentary elections were held in Finland on 17 March 1991, the first time a Finnish parliamentary election had been held on a single day. For the first time since 1962 the Social Democratic Party was displaced as the largest party in the Eduskunta, with the Centre Party winning 55 seats and forming the first centre-right, non-social democratic government since 1964, with Esko Aho as Prime Minister.

Results

By province

Aftermath
The new center-right coalition government would not have an easy time governing the country. The fall of the Soviet Union caused a collapse in trade with the east, which together with a worldwide recession, caused major economic problems including high unemployment and ballooning budget deficits. In response, the government adopted strict austerity measures, such as cuts in public spending, the unpopularity of which led to the government's defeat in the 1995 elections.

References

General elections in Finland
Finland
Parliament
Finland
Election and referendum articles with incomplete results